Hawk is a crime drama series starring Burt Reynolds, which aired on ABC from September 8, 1966 to December 29, 1966. The Screen Gems series was Reynolds' first starring role in a television series since leaving Gunsmoke the previous year.

Synopsis
Reynolds stars as police lieutenant John Hawk, a full-blooded Iroquois working the streets of New York City as a special detective for the city's District Attorney's office. Hawk is assisted by his African American partner, Dan Carter (played by Wayne Grice). Hawk and Carter deal with various common cases such as murder, organized crime and arson. While facing the brutal daily life of being a detective, Hawk's native heritage and ancestry also cause him to be subjected to discrimination and racism, both on the streets and in the office.

Many of the scenes were filmed on location in New York City, with some interior scenes filmed at the Filmways Studios in East Harlem.

The series co-stars Bruce Glover as Assistant D.A. Murray Slaken, and Leon Janney as Assistant D.A. Ed Gorton.

Notable guest stars who appeared in this series include Gene Hackman, Martin Sheen, Robert Duvall, Diana Muldaur, Scott Glenn, Diane Baker, James Best, Bert Convy, Elizabeth Ashley, Kim Hunter and Lou Antonio.

His character is a full-blooded Native American, but Reynolds had some Cherokee blood from his father's side.

Production
The show was announced in June 1966. ABC made a commitment for 17 episodes. The lead role was given to Reynolds who had some Native American ancestry himself and played Native Americans in Gunsmoke and in Navajo Joe.

"I wanted the Indian thing to come naturally", said Reynolds.

"The emphasis will be on how cops function at night", said producer Paul Bogart. "The people who come out at night would astonish you. They're the weirdos of all time."

A representative of ABC said "it won't be another Naked City where they want to know why the killer pulled the trigger. Hawk won't answer that question."

"We're not going for the psychological approach", said Reynolds. "We're an action adventure show. It's fast paced the music is all brass there's a lot of cutting."

"Hawk is quite a character", said Reynolds. "He's very hostile. I'm hostile too. I don't know why."

Reynolds says his performance was inspired by Kirk Douglas in Detective Story and John Garfield. "Tough and hard... I play Hawk as a catalyst. And how things affect me."

"We're placing no special emphasis on the fact that Hawk is an Indian", said Reynolds. "I'm not running around in moccasins or anything like that."

Reynolds added,"Having been in two TV series... where I hold the horse for someone else this feels great. But I'm not going to fall into the trap of thinking this is my one big chance and if I blow it Im finished. I've had so many disappointments over the years that I've made up my mind: if it doesn't go it's the audience's fault, not mine."

Reynolds says Hawk was originally meant to wear knives on his sleeves but he got that changed feeling it was too gimmicky.

The show was shot on location in New York.

"I do all the stunts because I can do them better than anyone else", said Reynolds.

Repeat broadcasts
Despite being a short-lived series, repeats of Hawk have resurfaced at least three times, as a way to present Reynolds' early work before he became a successful movie celebrity:

 Repeats of Hawk aired on NBC in the Spring of 1976, to capitalize on Reynolds' success in the same manner as CBS did with his later series, Dan August, in 1973 and 1975.
 Hawk would later be syndicated to local stations in 1984 through Colex Enterprises.
 Episodes of the series have also appeared on the digital multicast network GetTV.

Episodes

Reception

Critical
Reviewing the pilot the New York Times said it was "too shrill and intense to be entirely winning but it did have enough virtues to suggest the series may find a niche for itself."

Ratings
Ratings were poor and ABC announced the show's cancellation in October, when 12 episodes had been filmed.

Reynolds later called it "a good show but it went off quickly."

References

External links

 Hawk at Classic TV Archive
 Thomas Film Classics: "Hawk"

1966 American television series debuts
1966 American television series endings
1960s American crime drama television series
American detective television series
American Broadcasting Company original programming
Television series by Sony Pictures Television
Television shows set in New York City
Fictional police lieutenants
English-language television shows
Television series by Screen Gems
Television shows about Native Americans
Television series about prosecutors